Joseph Graham Reid (born 1945) is a British playwright from Belfast, Northern Ireland.

Background

Born into a working-class family in Belfast, Northern Ireland, Reid left school at age 15, served in the British army, married young, but returned to education and graduated from Queen's University in 1976. He became a teacher at Gransha Boys' High School in Bangor, County Down but left in 1980 to concentrate on his writing career. His first play, The Death of Humpty Dumpty is a story about an innocent man who gets caught in the cross fire of the troubles in Belfast.

Characters in his work The Hidden Curriculum were based on pupils and teachers from the school he taught at. Premiered at the Abbey Theatre, Dublin in 1982, after a subsequent production the following year at the Lyric Players Theatre in Belfast, Ulster Television commissioned a screenplay which was broadcast in 1984. His trilogy, colloquially known as the Billy plays, for the BBC's Play for Today series, were his breakthrough works. These are Too Late to Talk to Billy (1982), A Matter of Choice for Billy (1983) and A Coming to Terms for Billy (1984). The lead in these television plays is a young Kenneth Branagh, who had previously worked in Reid's futuristic play Easter 2016, which was screened as part of the BBC's Play for Tomorrow series. It was while working on the later two Billy plays that Reid met the actress Gwen Taylor whom he later married. In 1992 he wrote a screen play for the movie You, Me & Marley.

Plays

Remembrance, perhaps his most popular play, is a story about a Protestant widower and a Catholic widow who meet at their murdered sons' graves and fall in love over the objections of their surviving children.  The play has been performed all over the world: 18 months in Tel Aviv (in Hebrew), over eight months at Irish Arts Center in Manhattan, and at the Old Globe, San Diego.  The play was performed by the Tara Players of Winnipeg at the first Acting Irish International Theatre Festival in 1994.

References

1945 births
Living people
Male dramatists and playwrights from Northern Ireland
Schoolteachers from Northern Ireland
Writers from Belfast
Male writers from Northern Ireland
Alumni of Queen's University Belfast
Alumni of Stranmillis University College